Alfred Dehodencq (23 April 1822 – 2 January 1882; born Edmé-Alexis-Alfred Dehodencq) is a French Orientalist painter known for his vivid oil paintings of Andalusian and North African scenes.

Life 
Dehodencq was born in Paris on 23 April 1822. During his early years, Dehodencq studied in Paris at the Ecole des Beaux Arts under the tutelage of  French artist Leon Cogniet. During the French Revolution of 1848 he was wounded in his right arm, and thereafter painted with his left hand. He was sent to convalesce in Spain, where he remained for five years. Dehodencq became acquainted with the works of Spanish painters Diego Velázquez and Francisco Goya, which had a strong influence on his approach to painting.

In 1853 he travelled to Morocco, where for the following ten years he produced many of his most famous paintings depicting scenes of the world he encountered. Dehodencq was the first foreign artist known to have lived in Morocco for an extended number of years. He frequently drew and painted the Jews of Morocco. His painting A Jewish Woman with her Negro Maid (1867), as well as over 30 of his drawings, are in the collection of the Israel Museum, Jerusalem. While he considered himself to be the "Last of the Romantics," his work is generally categorized with the mid-19th-century Orientalist artistic movement.

In the 1860s, Dehodencq painted multiple versions of a work depicting the public execution of a young Jewish woman in Morocco, for the crime of converting to, and then renouncing, Islam; one of these paintings was exhibited at the Paris Salon of 1861 under the title Exécution d’une juive, au Maroc. Some scholars say that Dehodencq was inspired by the story of Sol Hachuel (beheaded in 1834 in Fez), but the artist's friend and biographer, states explicitly, in two books, that Dehodencq was an eye-witness to the execution he depicted, which took place in Tangiers.

Dehodencq married Maria Amelia Calderon in 1857 in Cadiz, Spain. They had five children, three of whom (Emmanuel, Armand, and Marie) died as children, before their father. Their son Edmond, born in Cadiz in 1862, was called the Mozart of painting because he debuted at the Paris Salon at age eleven. At age 18 he sculpted the bust that later adorned his father's gravesite.

In 1863, after 15 years abroad, Dehodencq returned with this family to Paris. He was decorated with the Legion of Honour in 1870. He committed suicide on 2 January 1882, having been sick for a long time. He was buried in the Montmartre Cemetery.

Selected works
 Bullfight in Madrid, 1850, Musée des Beaux-Arts de Pau

 Jewish concert at the palace of the Moroccan Qaid, 1854, special collection 
 The Execution of a Jewess, in Morocco, ca. 1860, Musée d'Art et d'Histoire du Judaïsme, Marais district of Paris
 The justice of the Pasha, 1866, Musée Salies, Bagnères-de-Bigorre
 Jewish bride in Morocco, 1867, Musée Saint-Denis, Reims
 Boabdil’s Farewell to Granada, 1869, Musée d'Orsay, Paris
 Jewish celebration in Tanger, 1870, Musée de Poitiers
 Portrait of Mrs. Dehodencq, Musée Magnin, Dijon
 Prince Piscicelli, 1850, Musée des Beaux-Arts de Bordeaux
 Portrait de Marie au nœud rouge, 1872, special collection
 A Confraternity in Procession along Calle Génova, Carmen Thyssen Museum, Málaga
 A Gypsy Dance in the Gardens of the Alcázar, in front of Charles V Pavilion 1851, Carmen Thyssen Museum, Málaga
 Gypsies on the road, Musée d'Orsay, Paris
 Jewish bride, Palais des Beaux-Arts de Lille
 Danse of negroes in Tanger, 1874, Musée d'Orsay, Paris
 Jesus raises the daughter of Jairus, Musée Magnin, Dijon
 Paris cafe scene, National Gallery, Washington, D.C.
 Little gypsy, Baltimore Museum of Art, Baltimore
 The arrest of Charlotte Corday after the murder of Marat, July 13, 1793, Musée de la Révolution française, Vizille

See also
List of Orientalist artists
Orientalism

References

Citations

Sources

 Catalogue des tableaux, esquisses, études et dessins par feu Alfred Dehodencq, catalogue for the posthumous sale of the artist's work at the Hôtel Drouot on June 1, 1885, with an introduction by Gabriel Séailles; Paris: Imprimerie de l'Art, 1885.
 Gotlieb, Matt (2009). "Figures of Sublimity in Orientalist Painting" in Studies in the History of Art, Vol. 74, Symposium Papers LI: Dialogues in Art History, from Mesopotamian to Modern: Readings for a New Century; National Gallery of Art, 2009, pp. 316–341.
 Hamel, Maurice. "Alfred Dehodencq", Revue de l'art ancien et moderne, v. 28, no. 163, October, 1910, pp. 269–284.
 Larousse, Pierre. "Dehodencq" entries in Grand dictionnaire universel du XIXe siècle: français, historique, géographique, mythologique, bibliographique..., vol. 17, suppl. 2, 1866-1877, p. 1008.

 Wright, Barbara and Lloyd, Rosemary. "Amis de jeunesse: Théodore de Banville, Armand Du Mesnil, Eugène Fromentin, Alfred Dehodencq: avec des lettres inédites et des illustrations par Eugène Fromentin et Alfred Dehodencq," Nineteenth-Century French Studies, Vol. 21, No. 3/4 (Spring—Summer 1993), pp. 322–338.

External links

Le Guignol des Champs-Elysées, one of the few known paintings by Edmond Dehodencq

French romantic painters
19th-century painters of historical subjects
Orientalist painters
1822 births
1882 deaths
Burials at Montmartre Cemetery
Painters from Paris
École des Beaux-Arts alumni
19th-century French painters
French male painters
19th-century French male artists